Ildemaro José Vargas (born July 16, 1991) is a Venezuelan professional baseball infielder for the Washington Nationals of Major League Baseball (MLB). He has previously played in MLB for the Arizona Diamondbacks, Minnesota Twins, Chicago Cubs, and Pittsburgh Pirates.

Career

St. Louis Cardinals
Vargas signed with the St. Louis Cardinals as an international free agent on June 24, 2008. He made his professional debut with the VSL Cardinals. He played for the club in 2009 as well, slashing .264/.368/.374 in 52 games. In 2010, Vargas played for the GCL Cardinals, batting .239/.317/.364 with no home runs and 15 RBI. He also played for the club in 2011, hitting .289/.391/.395 with 1 home run and 18 RBI. In 2012, he split the year between the rookie ball Johnson City Cardinals, the Low-A Batavia Muckdogs, and the High-A Palm Beach Cardinals, posting a .314/.378/.443 batting line with 4 home runs and 32 RBI between the three clubs. He spent the 2013 season with the Single-A Peoria Chiefs, slashing .248/.304/.305 in 115 games. He split the 2014 season between Palm Beach and the Double-A Springfield Cardinals, batting .236/.266/.286 with 1 home run and 40 RBI. On March 30, 2015, Vargas was released by the Cardinals organization.

Bridgeport Bluefish
On April 1, 2015, Vargas signed with Bridgeport Bluefish of the Atlantic League of Professional Baseball. In 30 games for the club, he slashed .273/.316/.318 with 8 RBI.

Arizona Diamondbacks
On May 26, 2015, Vargas signed a minor league contract with the Arizona Diamondbacks. He spent the remainder of the year with the Single-A Kane County Cougars, slashing .321/.385/.438 in 86 games. In 2016, Vargas split the year between the High-A Visalia Rawhide, the Double-A Mobile BayBears, and the Triple-A Reno Aces, posting a batting line of .305/.360/.400 with 6 home runs and 37 RBI between the three teams. The Diamondbacks added Vargas to their 40-man roster after the 2016 season.

Vargas started 2017 with the Reno Aces and was called up to the Diamondbacks on June 29. He hit .308 in 13 major league plate appearances in 2017 and .211 in 20 major league plate appearances in 2018. In 2019, Vargas hit .269/.299/.413 in 92 games for the big league club, notching 6 home runs and 24 RBI. On September 24, 2019, Vargas was brought in to pinch-hit in the ninth inning of a game against the St. Louis Cardinals and hit a home run that tied the game at 1–1. The game would go on for 19 innings, the longest game in Diamondbacks history, and ended when Vargas hit a walk-off single. Vargas went 3-for-20 in 8 games for Arizona in 2020 before he was designated for assignment on August 6, 2020.

Minnesota Twins
On August 11, Vargas was traded to the Minnesota Twins in exchange for cash considerations. He was designated for assignment without making an appearance for the team on September 2, 2020.

Chicago Cubs
On September 5, 2020, Vargas was claimed off waivers by the Chicago Cubs. He joined the team's active roster on September 7. On September 12, in a game against the Milwaukee Brewers, he hit a home run off of closer Josh Hader. In 6 games for Chicago, Vargas went 2-for-9. On March 28, 2021, Vargas was designated for assignment by the Cubs. On March 31, Vargas was outrighted to the minors. 

On April 13, 2021, Vargas was selected to the active roster after Matt Duffy was placed on the COVID-19 injured list. Vargas was removed from the 40-man roster on April 16, but was re-selected on May 4. After hitting .143 in 24 plate appearances, Vargas was designated for assignment on May 15, 2021.

Pittsburgh Pirates
On May 17, 2021, Vargas was claimed off waivers by the Pittsburgh Pirates. Vargas hit .077 in 7 games before being designated for assignment on May 30.

Arizona Diamondbacks (second stint)
On June 2, 2021, Vargas was traded to the Arizona Diamondbacks in exchange for cash considerations. Vargas immediately joined the active roster, his third team of the season, taking the place of infielder Domingo Leyba, who was designated for assignment. After going 3-for-17 in 9 games, Vargas was designated for assignment on June 19. He was outrighted to the Triple-A Reno Aces on June 22.
On September 19, 2021, Vargas's contract was selected by Arizona. Vargas hit .156 in 34 games in 2021, with 0 home runs and 7 RBI's. On October 8, Vargas was elected free agency.

Chicago Cubs (second stint)
On December 17, 2021, Vargas signed a minor league contract to return to the Chicago Cubs. He had his contract selected to the majors on May 10, 2022. He was designated for assignment on May 22, and elected free agency on May 26.

Washington Nationals
On May 27, 2022, Vargas signed a minor league deal with the Washington Nationals. He had his contract selected on August 2.

References

External links

1991 births
Living people
Arizona Diamondbacks players
Batavia Muckdogs players
Bridgeport Bluefish players
Cardenales de Lara players
Caribes de Anzoátegui players
Chicago Cubs players
Gulf Coast Cardinals players
Johnson City Cardinals players
Kane County Cougars players
Major League Baseball infielders
Major League Baseball players from Venezuela
Minnesota Twins players
Mobile BayBears players
Palm Beach Cardinals players
People from Monagas
Peoria Chiefs players
Pittsburgh Pirates players
Reno Aces players
Springfield Cardinals players
Venezuelan expatriate baseball players in the United States
Venezuelan Summer League Cardinals players
Visalia Rawhide players
Washington Nationals players